Lac is one of the 23 regions of Chad. Its capital is Bol. It is chiefly composed of the former Lac Prefecture. The region includes Chad's portion of the shore of Lake Chad.

Geography
The region borders Kanem Region to the north and east, Hadjer-Lamis Region and Cameroon to the south, Nigeria to the southwest, and Niger to the northwest.

The region is dominated geographically by Lake Chad, a seasonally fluctuating lake of major importance in this part of Africa.

Settlements
The regional capital is Bol; other major settlements include Bagassola, Daboua, Doum Doum, Kangalam, Kouloudia, Liwa, Ngouboua and Ngouri.

Demographics
Per the census of 2009, the population in the region was 451,369, 49.6% female. The average size of household was 4.60: 4.60 in rural households and 4.90 in urban areas. The number of households was 97,140: 94,857 in rural areas and 2,283 in urban areas. The number of nomads in the region was 16,025, 4.1% of the population. There were 450,424 people residing in private households. There were 194,211 over 18 years of age: 93,587 male and 100,624 female. The sex ratio was 101.00 females for every hundred males. There were 435,344 sedentary staff, 4.00 of the population.

The main ethnolinguistic groups are the Buduma (more than 18%), Fula and Kanembu (more than 66%).

Economy
The region is the principal agricultural segment in the whole country, producing cotton and groundnut, the two main cashcrops of the country. There are a variety of local crops like rice also grown in the region.

Administration 
The region of Lac is divided into two departments, namely, Mamdi (capital Bol) and Wayi (capital Ngouri). As a part of decentralisation in February 2003, the country is administratively split into regions, departments, municipalities and rural communities. The prefectures which were originally 14 in number were re-designated in 17 regions. The regions are administered by Governors appointed by the President. The Prefects, who originally held the responsibility of the 14 prefects, still retained the titles and were responsible for the administration of smaller departments in each region. The members of local assemblies are elected every six years, while the executive organs are elected every three years.

References

External links

 
Regions of Chad